In Cornwall, the churchtown is the settlement in a parish where the church stands, for example, 

Churchtown Mullion,
Churchtown Redruth,
Churchtown St Hilary,
Churchtown St Merryn,
Churchtown St Minver, 
Gorran Churchtown, 
Gulval Churchtown,
Illogan Churchtown,
Ludgvan Churchtown, 
Mylor Churchtown, 
St Breward Churchtown,
St Kew Churchtown, 
St Levan Churchtown, 
St Stephen Churchtown
Zennor Churchtown.

The Cornish for "churchtown" is Treneglos, although only one settlement kept the Cornish name, the rest converting to the English, or not being a settlement before English overtook Cornish and became the main language of that part of Cornwall. The churchtown will not necessarily be the main settlement in the parish.

External links

For other examples in Cornwall, see:
 Cornovia: An Index to the Historical Place Names of Cornwall (A Cornish Sourcebook)

Geography of Cornwall
English toponymy